The Chronicon or Chronicle (Greek: Παντοδαπὴ ἱστορία Pantodape historia, "Universal history") was a work in two books by Eusebius of Caesarea.  It seems to have been compiled in the early 4th century.  It contained a world chronicle from Abraham until the vicennalia of Constantine I in A.D. 325.  Book 1 contained sets of extracts from earlier writers; book 2 contained a technically innovative list of dates and events in tabular format.

The original Greek text is lost, although substantial quotations exist in later chronographers.  Both books are mostly preserved in an Armenian translation.  Book 2 is entirely preserved in the Latin translation by Jerome.  Portions also exist in quotation in later Syriac writers such as the fragments by James of Edessa and, following him, Michael the Syrian.

The Chronicle as preserved extends to the year 325, and was written before the "Church History".

Contents 
The work was composed divided into two parts. The first part (Greek, Chronographia, "Annals") gives a summary of universal history from the sources, arranged according to nations. The second part (Greek, Chronikoi kanones, "Chronological Canons") furnishes a synchronism of the historical material in parallel columns, the equivalent of a parallel timeline, where each line is a year. It is the longest preserved list of Olympic victors, containing however mainly the stadion (running race) winners  from 776 B.C. to A.D. 217. These tables have been completely preserved in a Latin translation by Jerome and both parts are still extant in an Armenian translation.

The work may be reconstructed from later chronographists of the Byzantine, especially George Syncellus.

See also
Chronicon (Jerome)
Mesopotamia in Classical literature
Universal chronicle

External links
 Eusebii ... Chronicon bipartitum, ex Arm. textu in Lat. conversum, adnotationibus auctum, Gr. fragmentis exornatum, opera J.B. Aucher - Only edition of the Armenian, with Latin translation.
 English translation of book 1 - from the Armenian text of Aucher, by Robert Bedrosian.
 English translation of book 1 - from the Armenian text, mirror if main site unavailable.
 English translation of book 1 - from the modern Latin translation of the ancient Armenian version.
 English translation of Jerome's Chronicon - book 2 of Eusebius with Jerome's additions.
 Catholic Encyclopedia article

4th-century history books
Greek chronicles
Patristic historical writings
4th-century Christian texts
Works by Eusebius of Caesarea
Ancient Olympic Games